Syed Ata Ullah Shah Bukhari (Urdu سید عطاء اللہ شاہ بخاری) (23 September 1892 – 21 August 1961), was a Muslim Hanafi  scholar, religious and political leader from the Indian subcontinent. He was one of the Majlis-e-Ahrar-e-Islam's founding members. His biographer, Agha Shorish Kashmiri, states that Bukhari's greatest contribution had been his germination of strong anti-British feelings among the Indian Muslims. He is one of the most notable leaders of the Ahrar movement which was associated with opposition to Muhammad Ali Jinnah and opposition to the establishment of an independent Pakistan, as well as opposition to the Ahmadiyya Movement. He is considered as a legendary rhetoric, which made him famous among the Muslims.

Birth and education
Born in Patna, British India, in 1892, he received his early religious education in what is now Gujrat, Pakistan and learned the Qur'an by heart from his father Hafiz Syed Ziauddin. He migrated to Amritsar in 1914 when he was 22 years old. He completed his early education by subscribing to a purist view of Islam, and remained associated with the Deoband School in Saharanpur district. Bukhari began his career as a religious preacher in a small mosque in Amritsar, and taught the Quran for the next 40 years. He shared friendship with a section of socialists and communists but did not accept their ideology completely. He was ‘imbued with a brilliant exposition of romantic socialism, and led Muslims to a restlessness activism'. He studied the Sahih Bukhari in jail when he was imprisoned for an anti-government religious speech.

Religious and political career

He started his religious and political career in 1916. His speeches graphically portrayed the sorrows and sufferings of the poor, and would promise his audience that the end of their sufferings would come about with the end of British rule. As the first step of his political career, he began to participate in the movements of the Indian National Congress in 1921 from Kolkata where he delivered a loaded speech and was arrested on 27 March 1921 because of that speech. He became an eyesore to the administration, and an official view about him said:
Ata Ullah Shah is a man, who it is better to lock up in jail, away from Congress leaders than to parley with. He has spent a considerable part of his life preaching sedition. He is an amusing speaker, who can influence a crowd.  After Nehru report Bukhari created All India Majlis-e-Ahrar-e-Islam with Mazhar Ali Azhar, Chaudhry Afzal Haq, Habib-ur-Rehman Ludhianvi, Hissam-ud-Din, Master Taj-uj-Din Ansari and Zafar Ali Khan on 29 December 1929. Later on the prominent Brelvi orator Syed Faiz-ul Hassan Shah also joined them too. He was also the founding father of Majlis-e-Ahrar, Indian nationalist Muslim political movement in India. In 1943, Ahrar passed a resolution opposing the partition of India and "introduced a sectarian element into its objections by portraying Jinnah as an infidel in an attempt to discredit his reputation." He led a movement against Ahmadis and held an Ahrar Tableegh Conference at Qadian in 21–23 October 1934. In 1949 he founded Aalmi Majlis Tahaffuz Khatm-e-Nubuwwat and served as first Emir. Bukhari was a central figure in the Khatme Nabuwwat Movement of 1953, which demanded that government of Pakistan declare the Ahmadis as non-Muslims.

Oratory and poetry
He became known for his oratory. He was also a poet and most of his poetry was in Persian. His poetic verses were compiled by his eldest son Syed Abuzar Bukhari in 1956 under the name of Sawati-ul-ilham.

Death
Bukhari died on 21 August 1961.  He is buried in Multan, Pakistan. on Tareen Road near Gultex Showroom near Children Complex.

References

Sources

 
 Syed Ata ullah shah bukhari ka aqeeda-e-khatm-e-nubuwwat
 Syed Ata Ullah Shah Bukhaqri ka khitab (Nawai-waqt Newspaper)
 Column of Nawabzada Nasrullah Khan
 Column of Professor Khalid Shibbir Ahmad
 
 
 Syed-ul-Ahrar, Ameer-e-Shariat, Khateeb-ul-Hind, Maulana Ata Ullah Shah Bukhari (rehmatullah-e-allaih
 Syed Ata Ullah Shah Bukhari ki zindagi (Nawai-waqt Column)

1892 births
1961 deaths
Critics of Ahmadiyya
Pakistani people of Bihari descent
Indian Sunni Muslims
Deobandis
Hanafis
Bihari politicians
Persian-language poets
Pakistani Sunni Muslim scholars of Islam
Writers from Patna
People from Multan
20th-century poets
Pakistani religious writers
Emirs of Aalmi Majlis Tahaffuz Khatm-e-Nubuwwat
Aalmi Majlis Tahaffuz Khatm-e-Nubuwwat people
Presidents of Majlis-e-Ahrar-ul-Islam